Every Life Counts is a campaign and support network for families whose child is diagnosed with fatal foetal abnormalities, and an anti-abortion campaign group in the Republic of Ireland. They campaign for the creation of a perinatal hospice in Ireland, as an opposition to abortion in cases of fatal foetal abnormalities, claiming it is not a "pathway to healing", and that abortion causes depression and distress.

They are opposed to the term "fatal foetal abnormalities" or "incompatible with life" calling it an "ugly term", preferring the term "life limiting condition". They point out that some people diagnosed with "fatal foetal abnormalities" (e.g. Patau syndrome  Trisomy 13), live for many years after birth.

After the 2016 Mellet v Ireland UN case, they claimed the United Nations Human Rights Committee "deliberately ignored the experiences of families who had received great joy and love from carrying their babies to term".

They made a submission to the Citizens' Assembly, which discussed Ireland's abortion laws, where they claimed that abortion is not a solution to a fatal foetal abnormalities diagnosis. They were selected as one of the groups to make a presentation to the members of the Citizens' Assembly.

See also

 Abortion in the Republic of Ireland
 Termination for Medical Reasons (advocacy group), a pro-choice equivalent organisation

References

Anti-abortion organisations in the Republic of Ireland